Parna is a genus of sawflies in the family Tenthredinidae, occurring in Europe and Japan.

References

Tenthredinidae